This is a list of the weapons of the Imperial Japanese Navy.

Tanks and armoured vehicles (WW II)

Regular light and medium tanks

Type 92 Jyu-Sokosha tankette 
Type 94 tankette 
Type 97 Te-Ke tankette
Type 95 Ha-Go light tank
Type 89A I-Go Kō medium tank 
Type 89B I-Go Otsu medium tank
Type 97 medium tank
Type 97 Shinhoto Chi-Ha Improved medium tank

Amphibious tanks

Type 1 Mi-Sha (a/k/a Type 1 Ka-Mi) amphibious tank
Type 2 Ka-Mi amphibious tank
Type 3 Ka-Chi amphibious tank 
Type 5 To-Ku amphibious tank

Amphibious APC
Type 4 Ka-Tsu Amphibious APC vehicle

Self-Propelled vehicles
Type 1 75 mm SPH Ho-Ni I
Type 1 105 mm SPH Ho-Ni II
Type 97 ShinHoTo Chi-Ha Short Barrel 120 mm gun tank
Navy Long Barrel 12 cm SPG

Armoured cars
Vickers Crossley armoured car
Sumida Model P armored car
Type 93 armoured car
Type 92 Osaka HoKoKu-Go armoured car

Cars and trucks
Type 95 Mini-truck
Amphibious truck Su-Ki

Artillery weapons (WWII)

Anti tank guns
Type 94 37 mm Anti-Tank Gun 
Type 1 37 mm Anti-Tank Gun 
Type 1 47 mm Anti-Tank Gun

Medium anti-aircraft gun
Type 96 25 mm Dual Purpose anti-tank/anti-aircraft gun
Vickers Type  Dual Purpose anti-tank/anti-aircraft gun
Type 11 75 mm AA gun
Type 88 75 mm AA gun 
Type 4 75 mm AA gun

Heavy anti-aircraft gun
Type 14 10 cm AA gun 
Type 3 12 cm AA gun 
Type 5 15 cm AA gun (project)
Type 3 80 mm AA gun 
Type 10 120 mm AA gun

Rocket launcher (ground use)
25 mm Rocket gun launcher
80 mm Anti-Tank rocket launcher
100 mm Anti-Tank rocket launcher
120 mm rocket launcher
120 mm Six-Rocket launcher
200 mm Rocket launcher Model 1
200 mm Rocket launcher Model 2
200 mm Rocket launcher Model 3
450 mm Heavy Rocket launcher
Type 6 Ground Use Bomb Projection rocket launcher Model 11
Type 6 Ground Use Bomb Projection rocket launcher Model 13
Type 3 Rocket launcher Model 1
Type 3 Rocket launcher Model 2
Type 3 Rocket launcher Model 2 modification 1

Rocket launcher (carrier-based)
75 mm Blast-Off Rocket launcher
120 mm Rocket launcher
120 mm 28-Rocket launcher
120 mm 30-Rocket launcher
150 mm Rocket Depth Bomb launcher

Infantry weapons of the Japanese Navy (WW II)

Rifles 
 Type 38 rifle
 Type 38 cavalry rifle 
 Type 44 cavalry rifle 
 Type 97 sniper rifle 
 Type 99 rifle 
 Type 99 sniper rifle 
 Type 'I' rifle
 TERA rifles (Type 100 rifle, Type 1 rifle, Type 2 rifle)

Pistols
Type 26 9 mm revolver 
Type 14 8 mm Nambu pistol
Type 94 8 mm pistol

Sub machine guns
Bergmann submachine gun 
Type 100 submachine gun

Machine guns
Type 11 light machine gun 
Type 96 light machine gun 
Type 99 light machine gun 
Type 3 heavy machine gun 
Type 92 heavy machine gun 
Type 1 heavy machine gun

Infantry mortar
Type 11 70 mm Infantry Mortar 
Type 94 90 mm Infantry Mortar 
Type 96 150 mm Infantry Mortar 
Type 97 81 mm Infantry Mortar 
Type 97 90 mm Infantry Mortar 
Type 97 150 mm Infantry Mortar 
Type 99 81 mm Infantry Mortar 
Type 2 120 mm Infantry Mortar 
Type 98 50 mm Mortar

Grenades and grenade dischargers
Type 10 Grenade 
Type 91 Grenade 
Type 97 Grenade 
[Type 99] Grenade 
Ceramic Grenade
Type 10 Grenade Discharger
Type 89 Grenade Discharger 
Rifle Grenade Dischargers

Light anti-aircraft weapons
Type 98 20 mm AA machine cannon 
Type 2 20 mm AA machine cannon 
Type 4 20 mm twin AA machine cannon 
Type 4 20m Twin AA machine cannon 
AA Mine Discharger

Anti-tank weapons
Type 97 20 mm AT Rifle 
Type 99 AT Mine 
Type 2 AT Rifle Grenade 
Type 3 AT Grenade 
Lunge AT Mine
Model 93 Pressure Anti-Tank/Personnel Mine
Model 99 Magnetic Anti-Tank Mine

Flamethrower
Type 100 flamethrower

Military sword
Type 98 Shin guntō Military Sword

Aerial bombs (WW II) 

 Type 3 No.1 28-Go Bomb T(Spreading) 
 Type 3 No.1 28-Go Bomb Type 2 Modify 1 
 Type 3 No.1 28-Go Bomb Type 2 Modify 2 
 Type 3 No.1 28-Go Bomb "Maru-Sen" steel board Anti Submarine 
 Type 3 No.6 27-Go Bomb 1,354 200 58.0 1.2 10.5 500(Spreading) 
 Type 3 No.25 4-Go Bomb Type 1 steel board Anti-Ground Anti Surface 
 Type 3 No.50 4-Go Bomb steel board Anti-Ground Anti-Surface

Electronic warfare (WWII)

Land-Based Radar 
 Type 2 Mark 1 Model 1 Early Warning Radar ("11-Go" Early Warning Radar) 
 Type 2 Mark 1 Model 1 Modify 1 Early Warning Radar ("11-Go" Model 1 Early Warning Radar) 
 Type 2 Mark 1 Model 1 Modify 2 Early Warning Radar ("11-Go" Model 2 Early Warning Radar) 
 Type 2 Mark 1 Model 1 Modify 3 Early Warning Radar ("11-Go" Model 3 Early Warning Radar) 
 Type 2 Mark 1 Model 2 Mobil Early Warning Radar ("12-Go" Mobil Early Warning Radar) 
 Type 2 Mark 1 Model 2 Modify 2 Mobil Early Warning Radar ("12-Go" Modify 2 Mobil Early Warning Radar) 
 Type 2 Mark 1 Model 2 Modify 3 Mobil Early Warning Radar ("12-Go" Modify 3 Mobil Early Warning Radar) 
 Type 3 Mark 1 Model 1 Early Warning Radar ("11-Go" Modify Early Warning Radar) 
 Type 3 Mark 1 Model 3 Small Size Early Warning Radar ("13-Go" Small Size Early Warning Radar) 
 Type 3 Mark 1 Model 4 Long-Range Air Search Radar ("14-Go" Long Range Air Search Radar) 
 Type 2 Mark 4 Model 1 Anti-aircraft Fire-Control Radar (Japanese SCR- 268) (S3 Anti-aircraft Fire-Control Radar) 
 Type 2 Mark 4 Model 2 Anti-aircraft Fire-Control Radar (Japanese SCR-268) (S24 Anti-aircraft Fire-Control Radar)

Airborne Radar 
 Type 3 Air Mark6 Model 4 Airborne Ship-Search Radar (H6 Airborne Ship-Search Radar) 
 N6 Airborne Ship-Search Radar 
 Type 5 Model 1 Radio Location Night Vision Device

Shipborne Radar 
 Type 2 Mark 2 Model 1 Air Search Radar ("21-Go" Air Search Radar) 
 Type 2 Mark 2 Model 2 Modify 3 Anti-Surface, Fire-assisting Radar for Submarine ("21-Go" Modify 3 Anti-Surface, Fire-assisting Radar) 
 Type 2 Mark 2 Model 2 Modify 4 Anti-Surface, Fire-assisting Radar for Ship ("21-Go" Modify 4 Anti-Surface, Fire-assisting Radar) 
 Type 2 Mark 3 Model 1 Anti-Surface Fire-Control Radar ("31-Go" Anti Surface Fire-Control Radar) 
 Type 2 Mark 3 Model 2 Anti-Surface Fire-Control Radar ("32-Go" Anti Surface Fire-Control Radar) 
 Type 2 Mark 3 Model 3 Anti-Surface Fire-Control Radar ("33-Go" Anti Surface Fire-Control Radar)

Radar-equipped Bomber devices for maritime reconnaissance/antisubmarine patrol 
 Mitsubishi G3M3 (Model 23) (Allied codename: "Nell"): This long-range bomber, beginning in 1943, was used as a radar-equipped maritime reconnaissance and electronic warfare aircraft.
 Mitsubishi G4M1 (Model 11/12) "Betty": From 1942, the G4M was also used for the same purposes as the G3M
 Nakajima B5N2 ("Kate")/Nakajima B6N1-2 Tenzan ("Jill"): In 1944, some torpedo bombers of mentioned types used with antisubmarine, radar detection (with finding radar equipment) and similar purposes in short- or medium-range maritime search missions from carriers or land bases.
 Aichi E13A1b ("Jake") Mark 11B:how model 11A, added surface-search radar and other night conversion with radar (E13A1b-S)
 Kawanishi H6K2,4, and 5 "Mavis" Marks 11, 22, and 23:more powerful engines, for ultra long range missions, long range sea radio equipment and surface-search radar added.
 Kawanishi H8K2 ("Emily") Mark 12:More potent engines for ultra-long range maritime recon missions, major heavy armament; also long range sea radio equipment and air-surface search radar added.
 Kawanishi E7K2 ("Alf") Mark 2: short range seaplane, fitted with magnetic anomaly detection equipment and surface-search radar for short range patrol and antisubmarine missions.
 Kyushu Q3W1 Nankai (South Sea): two place version of training aircraft Kyushu K11W1 Shiragiku, for antisubmarine patrol. Equipped with sea-surface finding antisubmarine sonar (one prototype)
 Kyushu Q1W1 Tokai (Eastern Sea; "Lorna"): Antisubmarine patrol aircraft. Equipped with surface-search radar and antisubmarine equipment for escorting convoys in the East China Sea, the Yellow Sea and the Sea of Japan during short periods in 1944-45.
 Mitsubishi Q2M Taiyo: advanced antisubmarine patrol design, derived from Mitsubishi Ki-67 Hiryu ("Peggy"). Was equipped with magnetic antisubmarine search device, air-surface radar and electronic antennae warfare. This design did not advance past the design stage during the war.

Torpedoes
Type 91 aircraft-launched torpedo
Type 92 submarine torpedo
Type 93 surface-launched torpedo
Type 95 submarine torpedo
Type 97 midget submarine torpedo

Surface-to-air missiles 
 Funryu Type1 radio-guided surface-to-air missile 
 Funryu Type2 radio-guided surface-to-air missile 
 Funryu Type3 radio-guided surface-to-air missile 
 Funryu Type4 radio-guided surface-to-air missile

Special weapons (World War II) 
 Suicide Attack Frogman "Fukuryu" 
 I-Go I-400 class submarine (Special Submarine) I-Go 402
 Aichi M6A "Seiran" special torpedo-bomber

References

Imperial Japanese Navy